"Into the Void" is a song by British heavy metal band Black Sabbath, released in 1971 on their album Master of Reality. An early version of "Into the Void" called "Spanish Sid" was released on the deluxe edition of Master of Reality. It is written in the key of C# minor.

Various artists have covered the song, including Soundgarden, Kyuss, Monster Magnet, Sleep, Dr. Know, Cavity, Exhorder, Thou, Lumsk, Dimmi Argus and Orange Goblin. 

"Into the Void" was ranked the 13th best Black Sabbath song by Rock - Das Gesamtwerk der größten Rock-Acts im Check.

In Soundgarden's version, the original lyrics are replaced by words of protest by Chief Seattle, which fit the metre of the song. At the 35th Annual Grammy Awards, the appropriately renamed "Into the Void (Sealth)" received a nomination for Best Metal Performance.

Influence
"Into the Void" has been listed as a favorite song by some of heavy metal's most notable performers. James Hetfield from Metallica lists "Into the Void" as his favorite Black Sabbath track. Eddie Van Halen has listed the song's main riff as one of his all-time favorites. Washington, D.C. hardcore punk band, Void, took their name from the song.

References

1971 songs
Black Sabbath songs
Soundgarden songs
Songs about outer space
Songs written by Ozzy Osbourne
Songs written by Tony Iommi
Songs written by Geezer Butler
Songs written by Bill Ward (musician)
Kyuss songs
Doom metal songs